Sabot may refer to:
 Sabot (firearms), disposable supportive device used in gunpowder ammunitions to fit/patch around a sub-caliber projectile
 Sabot (shoe), a type of wooden shoe

People 
 Dick Sabot (1944–2005), American economist and businessman
 Hamilton Sabot (born 1987), French gymnast

Vessels 
 Sabot (dinghy), a type of leeboard dinghy
 Naples Sabot, a type of centerboard dinghy
 US Sabot, an American sailing dinghy
 , a motorboat acquired by but never commissioned into the United States Navy

Other uses 
 Sabot (newspaper), a former US newspaper
 Le Sabot, a mansion in Senneville, Quebec, Canada
Manakin Sabot, Virginia, an unincorporated community